The 1994 Australian FAI Indycar Grand Prix was the opening round of the 1994 CART World Series season, held on 20 March 1994 on the Surfers Paradise Street Circuit, Australia.

Nigel Mansell, the defending winner and CART series champion, won the pole position in Newman-Haas's new Lola T94/00. Alongside on the grid was Michael Andretti, who was beginning his comeback to the CART series with Chip Ganassi Racing after spending a year in Formula One. Starting in eighth position was future CART and Formula One champion Jacques Villeneuve, making his first start in the CART series. It was also the Indy car debut of the Reynard chassis and the Honda engine.

The race start was delayed because of changing wet weather conditions and accidents during each of the first two attempts. The first incident occurred in Turn 12 (the final corner) and collected Raul Boesel, Willy T. Ribbs, Robbie Buhl, and Alessandro Zampedri. The second aborted start saw further carnage; this time in the second chicane involving Boesel and Zampedri again, along with Mario Andretti, Hiro Matsushita, and Davy Jones slowed the field. Bobby Rahal hit the tyre wall in the first chicane, apparently on his own, and Paul Tracy and Adrian Fernandez spun off in Turn 4, both cars undamaged. Boesel retired, while Jones and Matsushita were eventually push-started and continued in the race. However, Matsushita returned to the pits for a new rear wing as the marshals had accidentally broken off his already-damaged rear wing in their attempt to push the car away.  Fernandez turned around in the escape road and continued on, however the marshals were busy dealing with the first-chicane accident and Tracy sat against the turn 4 tyre wall for a full lap under yellow before the marshals could give him a push-start. Rahal later stated in an interview with ABC's Jack Arute that he was bumped from behind coming to the green flag and into another car. This broke the front wing, which then ran under the nose of the car, causing it to lose steering. 

The race finally started around 4 p.m., with Andretti overtaking Mansell on the first lap.

Michael Andretti got by Mansell after the start (the third attempt), as did Robby Gordon. In Turn 5 he muscled his way past Mansell, who soon outbraked the Californian in the same place. On Lap 17 Gordon spun and crashed after he clipped too much curb in the backstretch chicanes. Lap 20 saw the exit of Mark Smith, who locked up the right front, and Zampedri (in his third incident of the race) who seemed to be watching Smith rather than the road. As a result, he braked too late for the corner, locking up his right-front tire and slid off the track into Smith.

On the restart Andretti caught a huge break when Mansell spun on the damp track in front of Emerson Fittipaldi and Teo Fabi. A moment later in the second chicane Michael slid into the tyre barrier but continued on undamaged. Mansell later spun off in Turn 9 while passing Maurício Gugelmin. He spun the car around, but bumped the wall with the left rear tyre and stalled the engine. On Lap 38 Stefan Johansson and rookie Jacques Villeneuve touched coming towards Turn 9, ending the Canadian's IndyCar debut early. Later on, because of the delays, darkness fell over the circuit. Former racer Chip Ganassi, whose car was in the lead, was very concerned about visibility. He pleaded with CART to end the race after saying to ABC's Gary Gerould, "This is a dangerous situation! The lights are on along the pits here! The lights are on at the Marriott hotel...the race needs to be stopped!" The circuit was lit during the end of the race, but not sufficiently to run safely as a night race, and the 65 lap distance was shortened by 10 laps due to darkness. Andretti, leading all 55 laps, won in his Ganassi debut, which was also Reynard's first IndyCar race. This continued their record of winning on their debut in various categories including Formula 3 and F3000. Emerson Fittipaldi, driving the new Penske PC-23, finished second, followed by Mario Andretti, who began his final CART season with the final podium finish of his Indy car career. Jimmy Vasser and Stefan Johansson rounded out the Top five.

Qualifying results

R = Rookie driver, DNQ = Did not qualify, W = Andrea Montermini withdrew from the race after a crash during Saturday morning practice.

Race

Notes 

 Average Speed: 80.994 mph

External links
 Full Weekend Times & Results

Australian FAI IndyCar Grand Prix
FAI IndyCar Grand Prix
Gold Coast Indy 300